Luís Antônio Corrêa da Costa, nicknamed Müller, (born January 31, 1966) is a Brazilian football pundit and retired footballer who played as a second striker.

Club career
Müller is one of São Paulo's all-time leading scorers with 158 goals. With the club he won the Intercontinental Cup in 1993, scoring the third goal against A.C. Milan in Tokyo. He later had spells in Italy, and played for several other Brazilian clubs, such Cruzeiro. He retired from professional football in 2004.

International career

Müller made his debut for the Brazilian National team in March 1986, in a friendly against West Germany. He was on the losing side as the Germans won 2–0 in Frankfurt. He continued to appear in friendlies across that spring, including scoring his first goal for the National team against East Germany in a 3–0 home win. That summer, Müller played a part in each of Brazil's games in the 1986 FIFA World Cup in Mexico. Brazil were eliminated in the Quarter finals after losing a penalty shootout to France. Müller had been substituted by this point and his replacement, Zico, had missed a penalty (actually stopped by Joël Bats) in normal time with the scores level.

Müller played for Brazil in the 1987 Copa America. They were eliminated in the opening round by the eventual runners-up, Chile. He was then left out of Brazil's victory in the 1989 Copa America, but returned to the side in time to play in the 1990 FIFA World Cup in Italy. He registered two goals and an assist during an impressive group stage for Brazil, but the team fell to Argentina in the second round.

Müller would feature less after the World Cup and missed the 1991 Copa America, but he was recalled by Carlos Alberto Parreira and was a key player in the 1993 Copa America, where Brazil lost to Argentina on penalties in the Quarter Finals. Müller went to his third World Cup when he was named in the squad for the 1994 FIFA World Cup in the USA. By this time, Brazil's favoured strikers were Romario and Bebeto, and so Müller's contributions were limited to a nine-minute substitute appearance against Cameroon in the first round.

Müller would make fewer appearances for Brazil after the 1994 World Cup. His next appearance was in a home friendly against Wales in November 1997. His last appearance for the national team came in a friendly in September 1998 against Yugoslavia.

Style of play
Müller played in an "old fashioned" left sided forward position, despite being naturally right footed. His function as a second striker was primarily that of making passes, serving his teammates, and creating goalscoring opportunities or providing assists, but he was also capable of playing as a striker, due to his effectiveness on counter-attacks, as well as his ability to make runs from the left flank or cut into the centre to strike on goal with his stronger foot.

After football
After retiring from professional football in 2004, Müller worked as a television football commentator.

Personal life
Müller's brother, Cocada, was also a footballer.

Career statistics

Club

International

Honours
São Paulo
São Paulo State League: 1985, 1987, 1991, 1992
Brazilian League: 1986, 1991
Copa Libertadores: 1992, 1993
Intercontinental Cup: 1992, 1993
Libertadores Supercup: 1993

Torino
Serie B: 1989–90
Mitropa Cup: 1991

Palmeiras
São Paulo State League: 1996

Cruzeiro
Minas Gerais State League: 1998
Recopa Sudamericana: 1998
Brazilian Cup: 2000

Corinthians
South Minas Cup: 2001

Brazil U20
FIFA World Youth Championship: 1985

Brazil
Rous Cup: 1987
FIFA World Cup: 1994

Individual
Brazilian League Top Scorer: 1987
Top player of the Intercontinental Cup's final: 1992
Bola de Prata: 1997

References

External links

1966 births
Living people
People from Campo Grande
Brazilian footballers
Brazilian expatriate footballers
São Paulo FC players
Cruzeiro Esporte Clube players
Associação Portuguesa de Desportos players
Sport Club Corinthians Paulista players
Santos FC players
Associação Desportiva São Caetano players
Tupi Football Club players
Ipatinga Futebol Clube players
Sociedade Esportiva Palmeiras players
Torino F.C. players
A.C. Perugia Calcio players
Kashiwa Reysol players
Campeonato Brasileiro Série A players
Campeonato Brasileiro Série B players
Serie A players
Serie B players
J1 League players
Japan Football League (1992–1998) players
Expatriate footballers in Italy
Expatriate footballers in Japan
Brazil international footballers
Copa Libertadores-winning players
FIFA World Cup-winning players
1986 FIFA World Cup players
1990 FIFA World Cup players
1994 FIFA World Cup players
1987 Copa América players
1993 Copa América players
Brazil under-20 international footballers
Grêmio de Esportes Maringá managers
Association football forwards
Brazilian expatriate sportspeople in Japan
Brazilian expatriate sportspeople in Italy
Brazilian football managers
Sportspeople from Mato Grosso do Sul